St Bartholomew's Church is a parish church in the village of Burwash, East Sussex, England. It is a Grade II* listed building.

Building 
St Bartholomew's Church is located next to the A265 road.

Only the thick-walled tower survives from the original Norman church (built in 1090) with evidence of its origin being discernible by the great width of the mortar in which the stones are bedded and which can be seen from the outside.

The church was partially rebuilt and extensively restored in 1856; the chancel was completely renewed, although its 13th-century arch survives. This work also included the lowering of the floor and this in turn necessitated the removal of a considerable depth of earth from the surrounding churchyard. Some of the flooring of the church was again renewed owing to the considerable rotting of the old planks, in the years 1989 to 1990.

In the south aisle, a 14th-century cast-iron memorial slab is the oldest in England, as Burwash was a centre of the Wealden iron industry.

History 
The church was originally built in the Norman Era, in 1090, however only the tower survives of this original church.

See also 
 List of places of worship in Rother
 Burwash

References 

Grade II* listed churches in East Sussex
Grade II* listed buildings in East Sussex